Nadine Faustin-Parker (born 14 April 1976) is a Haitian hurdler born in Brussels, Belgium. She has represented Haiti at three Summer Olympics; (in 2000, 2004 and 2008).

She competed for the United States up to and including the 1999 indoor season, but represented Haiti at the 1999 World Championships.

She earned All-America honors at the University of North Carolina before graduating in 1999 and was inducted into the University of North Carolina Track and Field Hall of Honor in 2007.

She won the bronze medal at the 2002 Central American and Caribbean Games. She won the gold medal at the 2005 Central American and Caribbean Championships. She won the silver medal at the 2006 Central American and Caribbean Games. She also competed at the World Championships in 1999, 2001, 2003 and 2005, the World Indoor Championships in 2001, 2003, 2004 and 2006 and the Olympic Games in 2000 and 2004 without reaching the final.

Her personal best time is 12.74 seconds, achieved at the 2004 Olympic Games in Athens. This is the current Haitian record. She also holds the Haitian record for the 60 meter hurdles with 7.99 seconds.

Parker now is the Sprints and Hurdles coach for both men's and women's track at The University of Cincinnati in Cincinnati, Ohio, USA Go Bearcats!. She is credited with convincing American-born Marlena Wesh to sprint in the 2012 London Olympics for Haiti.

Achievements

Notes

External links
 

1976 births
Living people
Sportspeople from Brussels
American female hurdlers
Haitian female hurdlers
Haitian female sprinters
American sportspeople of Haitian descent
Athletes (track and field) at the 2000 Summer Olympics
Athletes (track and field) at the 2004 Summer Olympics
Athletes (track and field) at the 2008 Summer Olympics
Athletes (track and field) at the 2003 Pan American Games
Athletes (track and field) at the 2007 Pan American Games
Olympic athletes of Haiti
Pan American Games competitors for Haiti
Competitors at the 2002 Central American and Caribbean Games
Competitors at the 2006 Central American and Caribbean Games
Central American and Caribbean Games silver medalists for Haiti
Central American and Caribbean Games bronze medalists for Haiti
Central American and Caribbean Games medalists in athletics
21st-century American women